Nuurtherium is an extinct genus of tritylodontid cynodonts of the Late Jurassic Ulan Malgait Formation of Mongolia. It contains a single species, N. baruunensis, named by Paúl Velazco and colleagues in 2017.

References

Prehistoric cynodont genera
Fossil taxa described in 2017
Tritylodontids